Ilias P. Kasidiaris (born 30 November 1980) is a Greek politician and founder of the political party 
National Party – Greeks (Greek: Εθνικό Kόμμα - Έλληνες, romanized: Ethnikó Kómma - Éllines), formerly Greeks for the Fatherland (Greek: Έλληνες για την Πατρίδα, romanized: Éllines gia tin Patrída). He was a member of the Greek parliament, and one of the former leaders of the far-right party Golden Dawn. In October 2020, he was convicted of directing a criminal organization and sentenced to 13 years in prison, allegations for which he maintains his innocence.

Early and personal life
Ilias Kasidiaris was born on 29 November 1980 in Piraeus, Greece.

Kasidiaris' father, Panagiotis Kasidiaris, is a retired doctor while his mother is a teacher in philology with a specialization in archaeology. As a child he was attracted to gymnastics, martial arts, writing and history. For many years, he had been taking dance classes, including tango.

During his military service, he served in the 1st Raider/Paratrooper Brigade and more specifically in the 35MK Raider Squadron in Cyprus. He holds a degree in agriculture with a speciality in food chemistry from the Agricultural University of Athens.

Political career
In May 2012, Kasidiaris, on an interview conducted by Nikos Evangelatos on Skai TV, when asked about his opinion of Adolf Hitler, he declined to condemn him and stated that "his role in history will be judged in time", and stated again his stance against immigrants in Greece.

Kasidiaris quoted The Protocols of the Elders of Zion in a 23 October 2012 speech to parliament. Defending himself in a discussion of whether to lift his parliamentary immunity over his assault of Kanelli, he quoted the passage, "In order to destroy the prestige of heroism we shall send them for trial in the category of theft, murder and every kind of abominable and filthy crime." Kasidiaris, as well as two of his Golden Dawn colleagues, had their immunities stripped by a unanimous vote of the parliament.

In mid-2013, while in the parliament, Kasidiaris said that he and other members of parliament were Holocaust deniers.

Οn 17 September 2013, Kasidiaris and a number of other Golden Dawn lawmakers were arrested on 28 September 2013 on charges of belonging to a criminal organisation. The charge sheet included murder, extortion, and involvement in the disappearance of up to 100 migrants. On 2 October 2013, Ilias Kasidiaris was released on a 50,000 euro bail.

On 2 April 2014, Takis Baltakos and Ilias Kasidiaris were recorded on video discussing the incarceration of Golden Dawn lawmakers. Takis Baltakos, Samaras's most trusted adviser and chief of staff was filmed accusing Samaras of instigating a judicial inquiry against the Golden Dawn party for political gain. That week parliament voted to lift the immunity from prosecution of five Golden Dawn deputies. Justice Minister Athanasiou and Citizen Protection Minister Dendias were implicated in the video. Baltakos was forced to resign but then claimed that New Democracy and Golden Dawn has an informal alliance, with parliamentary voting support. The pre-trial detention and house arrest ahead of a trial was the most significant mass round-up of lawmakers since the military coup in 1967.

On 10 July 2014, Kasidiaris was taken into custody in Koridalos prison, on a charge of weapons possession with the intent to supply a criminal organisation. On 1 July 2015, Kasidiaris was released from custody after the council of appeals court judges deemed that "the legal weight" of the offense was not adequate to justify detention. Kasidiaris was required to report regularly to his local police station and under the conditions of his release was not allowed to visit Golden Dawns political offices.

On 15 July 2015, during rancorous debates in the Greek parliament on the passing of various bills required as a precursor to the commencement on negotiations to receive a third bailout of the Greek economy, Kasidiaris tore up papers during an speech.

Kasidiaris was present at an anti-mosque protest in Athens on 4 November 2016. The protest centered around the SYRIZA government's state funded mosque build that used Greek Navy land and state financing for its construction. 

On 18 December 2019, during the Golden Dawn trial, which had started in 2015, the prosecutor suggested that all defendants except Roupakias are found not guilty of murdering Pavlos Fyssas and all felonies. Among the defendants was Kasidiaris. However, on 7 October 2020, the jury verdict found Kasidiaris guilty of directing a criminal organization along with other members of Golden Dawn.

Televised Dourou–Kanelli assault 
On 7 June 2012, during a television appearance on ANT1, Kasidiaris, in response to a verbal disagreement, splashed a glass of water at Greek politician Rena Dourou, and then proceeded to slap multiple times Liana Kanelli after she struck him with a piece of paper.

The heated exchange was a fluid discussion focusing on the rights of immigrant workers vs right of the unemployed Greeks and the development of gas reservoirs in northern Crete eventually disintegrating from a heated debate to broken rhetoric from both sides about opinion on the Regime of the Colonels to the persecution of Golden Dawn activists. The discussion broke down when Kanelli referred to Kasidiaris as a fascist «φασίστα», Kasidiaris responded by derogatorily calling her «παλιοκομμούνι», that is, a dirty communist. Dourou intervened and said there was a democratic crisis in Greece and that Golden Dawn would take the country back 500 years, Kasidiaris threw the water at Dourou, and Dorou grinned at the subsequent scuffle as Kanelli hit Kasidiaris with a paper and Kasidiaris pushed her back and slapped her multiple times.

In Greece it was openly debated by the press whether Kasidiaris had been right or wrong and he was widely cheered online. In March 2015 Kasidiaris attended court to face charges of grievous bodily harm. Giorgos Papadakis, a presenter and journalist who witnessed the assault, stated that threats were also made to television crew and other employees.

A Facebook page dedicated to Kasidiaris picked up 6,000 'likes' within 24 hours. Kasidiaris was also awaiting trial for allegedly being the getaway driver for an armed assault on a university professor in Athens in 2007. He was found not guilty of all charges relating to the 2007 incident in March 2013, due to a lack of evidence against him.

Works
Kasidiaris has wrote seven books during his presence in Golden Dawn and his stay in prison.

References

External links
 

1980 births
Politicians from Piraeus
Living people
Agricultural University of Athens alumni
Golden Dawn (political party) politicians
Greek Holocaust deniers
Greek fascists
Greek neo-Nazis
Greek MPs 2012 (May)
Greek MPs 2012–2014
Greek MPs 2015 (February–August)
Greek MPs 2015–2019